Simon St. Quentin Whitfield (born May 16, 1975 in Kingston, Ontario) is a retired Olympic triathlon champion from Canada. Whitfield won 10 consecutive Canadian Triathlon Championships titles and carried the Canadian national flag during the 2000 Summer Olympics closing ceremony in Sydney, where he had won his gold medal, and the opening ceremony at the 2012 Summer Olympics in London, making him one of few Canadian athletes to be honoured twice as Olympic flag bearer.

Biography
As a young boy, Whitfield played soccer, until he began with triathlon at age 11, honing his early competitive skills in the Canadian Kids of Steel program. By age 15, he was pursuing triathlon on a serious competitive basis. At present, Whitfield lives in Victoria, British Columbia and maintains his second residence at Salt Spring Island.

Triathlon career
Whitfield won a gold medal in the triathlon at the 2000 Summer Olympics in Sydney, Australia. He got up off the ground after he and 14 other riders crashed in the bike race portion of the event and worked his way back near the leaders. In the foot race, he cut down the field one at a time then put on a finishing kick to take the victory. His final time was 1:48:24.02, which until 2012 stood as the fastest Olympic triathlon.

In the 2002 Commonwealth Games in Manchester, England he claimed gold again. He ended up in 11th place at the 2004 Summer Olympics with a time of 1:53:15.81.

Whitfield was named to the 2008 Summer Olympics team and won a silver medal while competing at his third consecutive games. With a time of 1:48:58, he finished 5 seconds behind the German gold medalist. Whitfield's accomplishment was made even more impressive considering he was a distant fourth behind the lead three runners heading into the final kilometre of the run before he burst forth into the lead with 200 metres remaining. Whitfield, exhausted by his effort to get back into the lead, was then passed by the eventual winner Jan Frodeno of Germany at the end of the race.

Whitfield competed at the 2012 London Olympics in Triathlon. After finishing 15th in the swim Whitfield was riding out of transition in his aero-bars when he was caught off balance going over a speed bump, falling off of his bike and breaking his collar bone, forcing him to drop out of the race. Although disappointed, Whitfield remained composed and tactful, apologizing to a fellow athlete who was involved in the crash. Throughout the Olympics Whitfield continued to defend fellow triathlete and Olympic competitor Paula Findlay from the media when she came last in the women's triathlon in the London games.

Whitfield retired in 2013.

Awards and honours
In 2017, Whitfeld was inducted into Canada's Sports Hall of Fame.

References

External links 
 
 
 

1975 births
Canadian male triathletes
Canadian people of English descent
Commonwealth Games gold medallists for Canada
Living people
Medalists at the 2008 Summer Olympics
Medalists at the 2000 Summer Olympics
Olympic gold medalists for Canada
Olympic medalists in triathlon
Olympic silver medalists for Canada
Olympic triathletes of Canada
Pan American Games bronze medalists for Canada
People educated at Knox Grammar School
Sportspeople from Kingston, Ontario
Triathletes at the 2002 Commonwealth Games
Triathletes at the 1999 Pan American Games
Triathletes at the 2000 Summer Olympics
Triathletes at the 2004 Summer Olympics
Triathletes at the 2008 Summer Olympics
Triathletes at the 2012 Summer Olympics
Commonwealth Games medallists in triathlon
Pan American Games medalists in triathlon
Medalists at the 1999 Pan American Games
Medallists at the 2002 Commonwealth Games